is a retired Japanese football player. He plays for Honda FC.

Playing career
Shogo Omachi played for Zweigen Kanazawa from 2013 to 2015. In 2016, he moved on loan to Honda FC.

After five seasons with Honda FC, Omachi opted to retire.

Club statistics
Updated to 20 February 2021.

References

External links
Profile at Honda FC 

1992 births
Living people
Tokoha University alumni
Association football people from Nagasaki Prefecture
Japanese footballers
J2 League players
J3 League players
Japan Football League players
Zweigen Kanazawa players
Honda FC players
Association football forwards